Tschingel (also Zingel) is a toponym of Central Switzerland. Properly referring to a horizontal rock face, it has in many cases been transferred to peaks, alpine pastures or settlements.

Tschingel may refer to:
A village of Sigriswil, district of Thun, canton of Berne
Tschingel (Oberhasli), peak
Tschingel (Axalp), peak
Tschingel, peak in Reichenbach im Kandertal municipality, canton of Berne
Tschingel (Uri), peak in Wassen municipality, canton of Uri
 Tschingel Glacier
 Tschingel Pass
 Tschingelsee, a lake in the valley Kiental of the Canton of Bern, Switzerland